Hosler is a surname which is popular in America, Western Europe, and some parts of Italy. Notable people with the surname include:

Jay Hosler, American writer
Mark Hosler (born 1962), American musician

See also
Hößler
Hosmer (surname)